Kcho or KCHO may refer to:
 Kcho, Cuban artist
 Kʼchò language, a language of Myanmar
 KCHO (FM), a radio station (91.7 FM) licensed to Chico, California, United States
 Charlottesville–Albemarle Airport, Virginia, United States (by ICAO code)